Kerstin Anér (28 March 1920 – 23 November 1991) was a Swedish politician and Christian writer.

Early life and education
Kerstin Anér was born in Stockholm; her parents were the business executive Josef Anér and Gunvor Anér, née Löfvendahl. Her brother Sven Anér is also an author and journalist. She earned a PhD in 1948 from Göteborgs högskola, one of the precursors of the University of Gothenburg, with a thesis on the Swedish press and literary scene in the 1790s.

Career
Anér worked at the literary magazine Bonniers from 1946 to 1959 and at the women's weekly Idun from 1951 to 1963, and was a producer at Sveriges Radio from 1956 to 1969. From 1976 to 1980 she was secretary of state in the Ministry of Education.

She was a member of the Swedish parliament from 1969 to 1985: in 1969–70 representing the city of Stockholm in the lower chamber, in 1971–76 representing the municipality of Stockholm (the constituency having been renamed and the parliament become unicameral), and in 1976–85 representing Stockholm county. Among other parliamentary posts, she was a member of the Agriculture Committee from 1972 to 1976 and of the Culture Committee from 1979 to 1982. From 1975 to 1981 she was second deputy group chairman of the Liberal People's Party. In parliament she was active in issues of research and the environment, and was amongst the first to pay attention to issues of privacy raised by computerisation. She participated in a number of government inquiries into issues including privacy, genetic technology and energy.

Anér was active for many years in the Swedish branch of Save the Children and was its chairman from 1978 to 1983.

She was also a keen debater representing a Christian viewpoint, and spoke widely throughout Sweden in both churches and Liberal People's Party branches. She published Christian writings and two of her hymns, "Du är större än mitt hjärta" and "Jublande lyfter vi här våra händer", appear in the 1986 Church of Sweden hymnal.

References

Further reading

1920 births
1991 deaths
Members of the Riksdag from the Liberals (Sweden)
Members of the Andra kammaren
Politicians from Stockholm
University of Gothenburg alumni
Members of the Riksdag 1970–1973
Members of the Riksdag 1974–1976
Members of the Riksdag 1976–1979
Members of the Riksdag 1979–1982
Members of the Riksdag 1982–1985
20th-century Swedish politicians